Jeffrey Asch, also credited as Jeff Asch, is an American television actor, known for his role as Maxwell Nerdstrom in the sitcom television series Saved by the Bell. He also made minor appearances in other sitcoms, such as Third Rock from the Sun, Friends, Step by Step, Scrubs, and Family Matters. His first screen credit was in Beach Fever, playing Ernie, in 1987. He also played a pizza delivery man in 1999 family film Little Heroes.

Filmography

Film

Television

References

External links 

Living people
Year of birth missing (living people)
American male television actors
American male film actors
20th-century American male actors